Igor Jurković (born 15 July 1985) is a Croatian heavyweight kickboxer fighting out of Poreč, Croatia. He was 6 times Croatian national champion 2004, 2005, 2006 in Thai boxing, and kickboxing champion 2005 in full contact, 2005 and 2006 in low kick rules, and also was sparring partner of Mirko Cro Cop. He has fought in K-1 and he is under contract with Glory promotion.

Since of 2 November 2015, he is ranked the #8 light heavyweight in the world by GLORY.

Biography and Career

Igor "The Istrian Warrior" Jurković was born in the city of Poreč, Croatia. He started kickboxing after watching Mirko Filipović knocking out Mike Bernardo, and as Bernardo was falling down, a new kickboxer, decisive to continue Croatian kickbox glory was rising. Igor was six time Croatian kickboxing champion, also W.A.K.O. amateur world champion under Muay Thai rules, also winning bronze and silver medals on other W.A.K.O. championships.

"Le Grand Tournoi"
He was K-1 Rules "Le Grand Tournoi" 2006 champion. He had a walkthrough in quarter finals because Frédérique Bellonie, last year's champion, suffered injury before tournament. In semi finals he defeated Frédéric Sinistra and won tournament defeating Magomed Magomedov in the final. Tournament was promoted by the K-1 organisation, it was only a prize tournament, not a K-1 qualifying tournament. After that he had a break in his career because of injury sustained while falling off the  motorcycle, but successfully returned to kickboxing and won few international tournaments.

Golden Glory
In 2011 he signed for Golden Glory, and successfully passed his first test on United Glory 14 event. He knocked down Pavel Zhuravlev in the first round, in the second round he dropped Pavel and broke his nose, causing ringside doctor to stop the fight.  After the fight Head Kick Legend magazine ranked Jurkovic as 20. heavyweight kickboxer in August 2011. He "sneaked" there due to a Win against Zhuravlev.

It was later announced that Jurković is scheduled to participate on K-1 World Grand Prix 2011 in Nanjing Final 16 on October 29. 2011, however the event was canceled as K-1 was suffering from financial problems.

2012
On 10 March 2012 he made another big step defeating Freddy Kemayo on "Cro Cop Final Fight", he won in a close fight after extra round.

He was expected to fight Ali Cenik on United Glory 15, but it was later changed and he faced Zabit Samedov, losing the fight via unanimous decision after suffering first round knockdown. Later in the fight Jurković was at least equal fighter, but knockdown was enough for Samedov to take deserved victory. In an interview after the fight he said that he was not ready for two tough fights in that short time.

He was scheduled to fight for the championship belt of Cristian Bosch under WBC Muaythai organisation, but he gave up because he was also scheduled to fight in the Glory summer tournament that was planned to happen in Ukraine but cancelled. In an interview Jurković said that he was sorry he could not fight for the belt as he believed that he could take it easily, and that he was never into Muay Thai but he felt the belt would have suited him.

Glory World Series have announced a Glory grand Slam heavyweight 16 man, one-night, single-elimination tournament event in Tokyo, Japan in December, and Igor is expected to be one of 16 participants.

October 6, 2012, Brussels, Belgium, Glory 2, it was last test before Glory Heavyweight Grand Slam, and another great victory. This time against Gregory Tony. Power advantage was on Jurković's side at the very beginning of the fight, his quick distance closing and power hooks were too much for French opponent. In the second round, after a punch Gregory's hand suffered a fracture, an old injury witch reopened. But that does not diminish Jurković's victory, which was achieved with many powerful body shoots. Three knockdowns in round two and referee stops the fight.

Glory Heavyweight Grand Slam
He competed in the sixteen-man 2012 Glory Heavyweight Grand Slam at Glory 4: Tokyo - 2012 Heavyweight Grand Slam in Saitama, Japan on December 31, 2012. At the opening stage, he faced Anderson "Braddock" Silva and gave up ten kilograms in weight. He lost via TKO when the referee stopped the bout in round one after he was floored twice.

2013
On 19 April 2013, Jurković vs. Cătinaș lived up to the expectations of many of the kickboxing fans that were in attendance at FFC03: Jurković vs. Cătinaș in Split, Croatia. A ton of damage was dished out over the course of the fight between both fighters and Igor Jurković won on a unanimous third-round decision in a fight that could have gone either way. After the fight he said that he didn't want to disappoint public and organisation despite breaking his fist in training.

After refusing to fight at Glory 9: New York, because wanted to fight in his hometown Poreč he fought Dževad Poturak at FFC06: Jurković vs. Poturak on June 14, 2013. Jurković dominated all three rounds and deservedly took unanimous decision win.

He fought Jhonata Diniz at Glory 12: New York - Lightweight World Championship Tournament in New York City on November 23, 2013 and lost the fight by first-round TKO. He looked good at the beginning of the fight but got too aggressive when Diniz dropped him with a punch, Igor continued to fight but Diniz finished the job.

2014
He faced Michael Duut at Glory 14 event in Zagreb, Croatia on March 8, 2014. Jurković dropped weight and fought in Glory light heavyweight division. He dropped Duut with punches two times in round one, and referee stopped the fight at 1:14.

He defeated Jovan Kaluđerović early in round one at FFC11: Jurković vs. Kaluđerović in Osijek, Croatia on April 4, 2014 in the main event of the night. Igor was checked with right cross early in the round but recovered and dropped Jovan with punch-knee combination. Finished the fight with few liver kicks at the time of 1:47.

He suffered quite a convincing defeat via UD at Glory 16: Denver by Artem Vakhitov in Broomfield, Colorado, United States on May 3, 2014. While focusing on leg kicks he was outclassed by Vakhitov's boxing and suffered first round knockdown. After the fight Igor said “I lost by judges’ decision, but it will not demotivate me. This is now behind me, the mach was OK, but I was not myself. I was slow and I did not have an answer to his combinations”.

Before break he will once again fight at FFC13 in a main event of the evening against Luis Tavares on June 6, 2014 in Zadar, Croatia.

Titles

Professional
2014 FFC Light Heavyweight Champion (-95 kg) 
2010 International Open Muay Thai Cup BiH 2010 Tournament Champion
2006 K-1 Rules "Le Grand Tournoi" Champion -100 kg
2005 King's Birthday WMC-S1 Championship Tournament Runner-up -90 kg

Amateur
2010 Serbia Open 2010 Tournament Champion 
2010 
2007 W.A.K.O. World Championships  -91 kg 
2006 W.A.K.O. European Championships  -91 kg 
2006 
2006 
2005 W.A.K.O. World Championships  -91 kg 
2005 
2005 
2005  -86 kg
2004 W.A.K.O. European Championships  -86 kg 
2004  -86 kg

Kickboxing record (Incomplete)

|-
|-  style="background:#cfc;"
| 2014-11-21 || Win ||align=left| Dennis Stolzenbach || FFC15: Poreč || Poreč, Croatia || Decision (Unanimous) || 3 || 3:00 || 28–7
|-
! style=background:white colspan=9 |
|-
|-  style="background:#cfc;"
| 2014-06-06 || Win ||align=left| Luis Tavares || FFC13: Jurković vs. Tavares || Zara, Croatia || Decision (Unanimous) || 3 || 3:00 || 27–7
|-
|-  style="background:#fbb;"
| 2014-05-03 || Loss ||align=left| Artem Vakhitov || Glory 16: Denver || Broomfield, Colorado, USA || Decision (Unanimous) || 3 || 3:00 || 26–7
|-
|-  style="background:#cfc;"
| 2014-04-04 || Win ||align=left| Jovan Kaluđerović || FFC11: Jurković vs. Kaluđerović || Osijek, Croatia || KO (Liver Kick)  || 1 || 1:47 || 26–6
|-
|-  style="background:#cfc;"
| 2014-03-08 || Win ||align=left| Michael Duut || Glory 14: Zagreb ||Zagreb, Croatia || KO || 1 || 1:14 || 25–6
|-
! style=background:white colspan=9 |
|-
|-  style="background:#fbb;"
| 2013-11-23 || Loss ||align=left| Jhonata Diniz || Glory 12: New York ||New York City, New York, USA || TKO (Right Hook) || 1 ||  1:59 || 24–6
|-
|-  style="background:#cfc;"
| 2013-06-14 || Win ||align=left| Dževad Poturak || FFC06: Jurković vs. Poturak || Poreč, Croatia || Decision (Unanimous) || 3 || 3:00 || 24–5
|-
|-  style="background:#cfc;"
| 2013-04-19 || Win||align=left| Raul Cătinaș || FFC03: Jurković vs. Cătinaș || Split, Croatia ||Decision (Unanimous) ||3 || 3:00 || 23–5
|-
|-  style="background:#fbb;"
| 2012-12-31 || Loss ||align=left| Anderson Silva || Glory 4: Tokyo - Heavyweight Grand Slam Tournament, First 16 || Saitama, Japan || TKO (Referee Stoppage) || 1 || 1:29 || 22–5
|-
|-  style="background:#cfc;"
| 2012-10-06 || Win ||align=left| Grégory Tony || Glory 2: Brussels || Brussels, Belgium || TKO (Ref Stop/3 Knockdowns) || 2 || 2:40 || 22–4
|-
|-  style="background:#fbb;"
| 2012-03-23 || Loss ||align=left| Zabit Samedov|| United Glory 15 || Moscow, Russia || Decision (Unanimous) || 3 || 3:00 || 21–4
|-
|-  style="background:#cfc;"
| 2012-03-10 || Win ||align=left| Freddy Kemayo || Cro Cop Final Fight || Zagreb, Croatia || Ext. R. Decision (Majority) || 4 || 3:00 || 21–3
|-
|-  style="background:#cfc;"
| 2011-11-05 || Win ||align=left| Tomaž Simonič || Nova Gorica Fight Night 2 || Nova Gorica, Slovenia || TKO (Body Shot) || 2 || N/A || 20–3
|-
|-  style="background:#cfc;"
| 2011-05-28 || Win ||align=left| Pavel Zhuravlev || United Glory 14: 2010-2011 World Series Finals || Moscow, Russia || TKO (Doctor Stoppage) || 2 || 0:20 || 19–3
|-
|-  style="background:#cfc;"
| 2011-04-17 || Win ||align=left| Goran Radonjić || WFC 13: Heavy Hitters || Belgrade, Serbia || Decision (Unanimous) || 3 || 3:00 || 18–3
|-
|-  style="background:#cfc;"
| 2011-02-25 || Win ||align=left| Mattia Fonte Basso || Trieste Fight Night || Trieste, Italy || TKO (Ref Stoppage) || 3 || N/A || 17–3
|-
|-  style="background:#cfc;"
| 2010-12-09 || Win ||align=left| Vladimir Mineev || WFC 12: Proteini.si Showtime || Ljubljana, Slovenia || Ext. R. Decision || 4 || 3:00 || 16–3
|-
|-  style="background:#cfc;"
| 2010-10-29 || Win ||align=left| Nermin Halilovic || Sarajevo Fight Night 2 || Sarajevo, Bosnia and Herzegovina || TKO (High Kick) || 1 || N/A || 15–3
|-
|-  style="background:#cfc;"
| 2010-09-26 || Win ||align=left| Ante Verunica || Memorijal Ludviga Lutka Pavlovića, final || Ljubuski, Bosnia and Herzegovina || Decision (Split) || 3 || 3:00 || 14–3
|-
! style=background:white colspan=9 |
|-
|-  style="background:#cfc;"
| 2010-09-26 || Win ||align=left| Tihamer Brunner || Memorijal Ludviga Lutka Pavlovića, semi finals || Ljubuski, Bosnia and Herzegovina || TKO (Broken Elbow) || 2 || N/A || 13–3
|-
|-  style="background:#cfc;"
| 2010-07-31 || Win ||align=left| Muamer Tufekčić || WFC 11: Bash at the Beach || Portoroz, Slovenia || Decision || 3 || 3:00 || 12–3
|-
|-  style="background:#fbb;"
| 2010-07-09 || Loss ||align=left| Marin Došen || Mega Fight || Umag, Croatia || Decision || 3 || 3:00 ||11–3
|-
|-  style="background:#cfc;"
| 2010-04-18 || Win ||align=left| Igor Mihaljević || 5. Kickboxing memorijal "David Šain" || Poreč, Croatia || TKO (Leg Injury) || 2 || N/A || 11–2
|-
|-  style="background:#cfc;"
| 2010-03-20 || Win ||align=left| Adis Dadović || Noć Šampiona || Zenica, Bosnia and Herzegovina || KO (High Kick) || 2 || N/A || 10–2
|-
|-  style="background:#cfc;"
| 2009-12-23 || Win ||align=left| Sanid Imamović || Noć Boksa  || Zara, Croatia || KO || 1 || N/A || 9–2
|-
|-  style="background:#cfc;"
| 2007-03-16|| Win ||align=left| Mario Milosavljević || Obračun na 4 rijeke - Noć gladijatora || Karlovac, Croatia || KO (High Kick) || 1 || N/A || 8–2
|-
|-  style="background:#cfc;"
| 2006-10-15 || Win ||align=left| Dragan Jovanović || Hrvatska - Srbija || Osijek, Croatia || Decision (Unanimous) || 3 || 3:00 || 7–2
|-
|-  style="background:#cfc;"
| 2006-05-26 || Win ||align=left| Magomed Magomedov || K-1 Rules "Le Grand Tournoi" 2006, Final || Paris, France || Decision || 3 || 3:00 || 6–2
|-
! style=background:white colspan=9 |
|-
|-  style="background:#cfc;"
| 2006-05-26 || Win ||align=left| Frédéric Sinistra || K-1 Rules Le Grand Tournoi 2006, Semi Finals || Paris, France || KO (High Kick) || 3 || N/A || 5–2
|-
! style=background:white colspan=9 |
|-
|-  style="background:#cfc;"
| 2006-04-15 || Win ||align=left| Josip Ivanisic || 1. Kickboxing memorijal "David Šain" || Poreč, Croatia || Decision || 3 || 3:00 || 4–2
|-
|-  style="background:#fbb;"
| 2005-12-05 || Loss ||align=left| Magomed Magomedov || King's Birthday S-1 Championship, Final || Bangkok, Thailand || Decision || 3 || 3:00 || 3–2
|-
! style=background:white colspan=9 |
|-
|-  style="background:#cfc;"
| 2005-12-05 || Win ||align=left| Iszmir || King's Birthday S-1 Championship, Semi Finals || Bangkok, Thailand || KO || N/A || N/A || 3–1
|-
|-  style="background:#cfc;"
| 2005-07-22 || Win ||align=left| Ivan Stanić || Gold Liga || Mali Losinj, Croatia || N/A || N/A || N/A || 2–1
|-
|-  style="background:#fbb;"
| 2005-06-24 || Loss ||align=left| Tomáš Hron || Fighters' Night || Krupka, Czech Republic || Decision || 5 || 2:00 || 1–1
|-
|-  style="background:#cfc;"
| 2005-01-14 || Win ||align=left| Bojan Glavaš || Sokol Kup - Gold Liga || Pula, Croatia || Decision || 3 || 3:00 || 1–0
|-

|-
|-  style="background:#fbb;"
| 2010-05-01 || Loss ||align=left| Ante Verunica || Croatian Kickboxing Championship, Low-Kick +91 kg Final || Šibenik, Croatia || N/A || N/A || N/A
|-
! style=background:white colspan=9 |
|-
|-  style="background:#cfc;"
| 2010-05-01 || Win ||align=left| N/A || Croatian Kickboxing Championship, Low-Kick +91 kg Semi Finals || Šibenik, Croatia || N/A || N/A || N/A
|-
|-  style="background:#cfc;"
| 2010-01-31 || Win ||align=left| Mladen Božić || Serbia Open 2010, Final || Beograd, Serbia || Decision (Unanimous) || 3 || 2:00
|-
! style=background:white colspan=9 |
|-
|-  style="background:#cfc;"
| 2010-01-30 || Win ||align=left| Srdjan Seleš || Serbia Open 2010, Semi Finals || Beograd, Serbia || Decision (Unanimous) || 3 || 2:00
|-
|-  style="background:#cfc;"
| 2010-01-30 || Win ||align=left| Filip Boranijev || Serbia Open 2010, Quarter Finals || Beograd, Serbia || KO || 3 || N/A
|-
|-  style="background:#fbb;"
| 2007-09-30 || Loss ||align=left| Yauhen Anhalevich || W.A.K.O World Championships 2007, Low-Kick Final -91 kg || Belgrade, Serbia || Decision (Split) || 3 || 2:00
|-
! style=background:white colspan=9 |
|-
|-  style="background:#cfc;"
| 2007-09-?? || Win ||align=left| Dmitriy Antonenko || W.A.K.O World Championships 2007, Low-Kick Semi Final -91 kg || Belgrade, Serbia || Decision (Split) || 3 || 2:00
|-
|-  style="background:#cfc;"
| 2007-09-?? || Win ||align=left| Umberto Lucci || W.A.K.O World Championships 2007, Low-Kick Quarter Finals -91 kg || Belgrade, Serbia || Decision (Unanimous) || 3 || 2:00
|-
|-  style="background:#cfc;"
| 2007-09-?? || Win ||align=left| Pete Motaung || W.A.K.O World Championships 2007, Low-Kick 1st Round -91 kg || Belgrade, Serbia || KO || 1 || N/A
|-
|-  style="background:#cfc;"
| 2006-11-?? || Win ||align=left| Dalibor Krsic || W.A.K.O European Championships 2006, Thai-Boxing Quarter Finals -91 kg || Skopje, Macedonia || KO || 2 || N/A
|-
! style=background:white colspan=9 |
|-
|-  style="background:#cfc;"
| 2006-02-26 || Win ||align=left| Vladimir Čelar || Croatian Kickboxing Championship, Thai-Boxing -91 kg Final || Zadar, Croatia || Decision || 3 || 2:00
|-
! style=background:white colspan=9 |
|-
|-  style="background:#cfc;"
| 2005-09-?? || Win ||align=left| Alexei Shevtsova || W.A.K.O World Championships 2005, Thai-Boxing Final -91 kg || Agadir, Morocco || Decision  || 3 || 2:00
|-
! style=background:white colspan=9 |
|-
|-  style="background:#cfc;"
| 2005-09-22 || Win ||align=left| Andrei Malchanau || W.A.K.O World Championships 2005, Thai-Boxing Semi Finals -91 kg || Agadir, Morocco || N/A || N/A || N/A
|-
|-  style="background:#cfc;"
| 2005-04-05 || Win ||align=left| Marin Roso || Croatian Kickboxing Championship, Low-Kick -86 kg Final || Rijeka, Croatia || KO || 1 || N/A
|-
! style=background:white colspan=9 |
|-
|-  style="background:#cfc;"
| 2005-04-05 || Win ||align=left| Tomislav Jurić || Croatian Kickboxing Championship, Low-Kick -86 kg Semi Finals || Rijeka, Croatia || KO || N/A || N/A
|-
|-  style="background:#cfc;"
| 2005-04-05 || Win ||align=left| N/A || Croatian Kickboxing Championship, Low-Kick -86 kg Quarter Finals || Rijeka, Croatia || KO || N/A || N/A
|-
|-  style="background:#cfc;"
| 2005-03-05 || Win ||align=left| Dragan Kuzmić || Croatian Kickboxing Championship, Full-Contact -86 kg Final || Zagreb, Croatia || RTD || 2 || N/A
|-
! style=background:white colspan=9 |
|-
|-  style="background:#cfc;"
| 2005-03-05 || Win ||align=left| N/A || Croatian Kickboxing Championship, Full-Contact -86 kg Semi Finals || Zagreb, Croatia || N/A || N/A || N/A
|-
|-  style="background:#fbb;"
| 2004-10-?? || Loss ||align=left| Yauhen Anhalevich || W.A.K.O European Championships 2004, Thai-Boxing Semi Finals -86 kg || Budva, Montenegro || Decision (Split) || 3 || 2:00
|-
! style=background:white colspan=9 |
|-
|-  style="background:#cfc;"
| 2004-10-?? || Win ||align=left| Pawel Jasinski || W.A.K.O European Championships 2004, Thai-Boxing Quarter Finals -86 kg || Budva, Montenegro || Decision (Unanimous) || 3 || 2:00
|-
|-  style="background:#cfc;"
| 2004-05-16 || Win ||align=left| Dean Deanović || Croatian Kickboxing Championship, Thai-Boxing -86 kg Final || Osijek, Croatia || N/A || N/A || N/A
|-
! style=background:white colspan=9 |
|-
|-  style="background:#cfc;"
| 2004-05-16 || Win ||align=left| N/A || Croatian Kickboxing Championship, Thai-Boxing -86 kg Semi Finals || Osijek, Croatia || N/A || N/A || N/A
|-
|-
| colspan=9 | Legend:

See also
List of WAKO Amateur World Championships
List of WAKO Amateur European Championships
List of male kickboxers

References

External links
Official site of King Poreč gym
Profile at FightLife.ru
Profile at WFC
Profile at Glory World Series

Living people
1985 births
Croatian male kickboxers
Croatian Muay Thai practitioners
Croatian expatriate sportspeople in the Netherlands
Heavyweight kickboxers
People from Poreč
Glory kickboxers